Guy Montgomery's Guy Mont-Spelling Bee is a New Zealand television comedy panel show on Three presented by Guy Montgomery and co-hosted by Sanjay Patel. The show is loosely based on a spelling bee: each episode, four comedians participate in a series of word games. The winner of each episode competes again the following week, and the loser of each episode must wear a dunce cap in the Dunce's Corner.

Background and production 
Guy Montgomery, inspired by the Scripps National Spelling Bee, began hosting spelling bees with other comedians over Zoom and broadcast live on YouTube during the COVID-19 pandemic. Following the success of those games, Montgomery developed the concept into a show at the Melbourne International Comedy Festival.

Guy Mont-Spelling Bee was developed into a television series by Montgomery together with comedian Joseph Moore and the production company Kevin & Co. Montgomery is also the showrunner.

Format 
Every episode begins with The Spelling Round, a standard spelling bee round in which the contestants select a word from three containers with varying levels of spelling difficulty ranging from 13 points: the Coward's Cup, the Person's Purse, or the Bucket of Bravery. Other rounds used in some of the episodes include:

 Celebrities: Guests spell a celebrity's name given their picture.
 Choose A Letter: Guests pick a letter, and then must spell a given animal name without using that letter.
 Flags: Guests pick words from a board covered in world flags.
 Hard Words For a 13 Year Old: Guests are each joined by a 13-year-old, who may win a prize.
 Homophones: Guests must spell the correct word from homophones.
 Household Adjectives: Guests are given adjectives to spell based on various household items.
 Instruments: Guests hear a musical instrument and must spell it.
 Invent A Word: Guests must create the best new word for a given concept.
 Object Round: Guests spell a given word using physical objects.
 Social Media: Montgomery confronts guests with past social media posts, and they must recreate or rectify typos, or spell a given related word.
 Spell It Better: Guests invent a new and improved spelling for an existing word.
 Spell Like a Six Year Old: Guests must match the spelling of a 6-year-old child.
 Spell The Animal: Montgomery wears a series of animal masks which inspire the words that the guests must spell.
 Spell The Audience Name: Guests choose a member of the audience and then must spell their full name.
 Spell The Colour: Guests pick words to spell from a multi-coloured board.
 Wingdings: Guests must translate a word displayed in Wingdings.

Each episode ends with The Buzz Round, a themed, timed, fast-paced round in which contestants hit a buzzer first for the chance to spell each word; they lose a point if the spelling is incorrect.

Episodes

Series 1 (2023)

References 

English-language television shows
2020s New Zealand television series
New Zealand game shows
Panel games
Television shows funded by NZ on Air
2023 New Zealand television series debuts